Osama Hosny Lotfy Abdel Sattar (born June 18, 1982) is a retired Egyptian footballer. He played the forward position for Egypt's African Super Cup Championship club Al Ahly. An Egyptian international but missed out on the 2006 African Cup of Nations in Egypt through injury.

Club career
He was a fine attacking striker who was a regular goal scorer for the African champions and played a major part in their CAF Champions League 2005 triumph scoring 3 goals. He scored 3 goals again in CAF Champions League 2006 helping Al Ahly to defend his title.

Osama has a great ability to score from any place, especially with his golden head. He scored 5 goals in one game against Koroum in the Egyptian League (2003–2004). Osama is famous for his good manners, and he was the vice-captain of Al-Ahly team.

He transferred to Misr El Makasa club in summer 2011. On 15 September 2014, he announced his retirement from football.

Memorable shots
 An accurate header in the CAF Champions League 2005 final against Etoile Sportive du Sahel of Tunisia in Egypt's Military Academy Stadium. The game ended 3–0 for Al Ahly winning the Cup.
 Two important goals in Cairo against Enyimba of Nigeria, in the group stage of CAF Champions League 2005, giving Al Ahly the 3 points of the watch with a win 2–1.
 Scored Twice in Egyptian Soccer Cup Final 2007 Against El-Zamalek when he substituted in last five minutes in the Extra time, giving Al-Ahly the cup with a win 4–3.

Honours

Club
Al Ahly:
 Egyptian Premier League (7): 2004–2005, 2005–2006, 2006–2007, 2007–2008, 2008–2009, 2009–2010, 2010–2011
 Egypt Cup (3): 2003, 2006, 2007
 Egyptian Super Cup (6): 2003, 2005, 2006, 2007, 2008, 2010
 CAF Champions League (3): 2005, 2006, 2008
 African Super Cup (3): 2006, 2007, 2009
 FIFA Club World Cup 2006: 3rd place

References

External links

1982 births
Living people
Egyptian footballers
Egypt international footballers
Al Ahly SC players
Association football forwards
People from Sharqia Governorate
Egyptian Premier League players